Qarah Ayaq (also Romanized as Qarah Āyāq and Qarah Ayāq) is a village in Yowla Galdi Rural District, in the Central District of Showt County, West Azerbaijan Province, Iran. At the 2006 census, its population was 1,617, in 343 families.

References 

Populated places in Showt County